The sixth series of The Great British Sewing Bee began on 22 April 2020. Joe Lycett returned as the presenter of the show with both Esme Young and Patrick Grant returning as the judges. The series consisted of 12 contestants competing to be named the best sewer. For series six, the show moved from BBC Two to BBC One and increased from eight episodes to 10, becoming the channel's top rated show during its run.

The Sewers

Results and Eliminations 

 Sewer was the series winner

 Sewer was the series runner-up

 Best Garment: Sewer won Garment of the Week

 One of the judges' favourite sewers

 Sewer was safe and got through to next round

 One of the judges' least favourite sewers

 Sewer was eliminated

Episodes 

 Sewer eliminated   Garment of the Week

Episode 1: Wardrobe Staples Week

Episode 2: Holiday Week

Episode 3: Children's Week

Episode 4: Sports Week

Episode 5: Lingerie and Sleepwear Week

Episode 6: Reduce, Reuse, and Recycle Week

In the Made-to-Measure Challenge, the sewers all had to make their winter dresses from recycled knitwear. For the first time, the judges could not agree and chose two Garments of the Week.

Episode 7: 1980's Week

Episode 8: World Sewing Week

Episode 9: Movie Week

Episode 10: Celebration Week

Ratings

Official ratings are taken from BARB.

References

2020 British television seasons
The Great British Sewing Bee